Cornwall Hills Provincial Park is a provincial park in British Columbia, Canada, immediately west of Cache Creek, protecting part of the Cornwall Hills including their highest summit which features an old fire lookout.

See also
Blue Earth Lake Provincial Park
Oregon Jack Provincial Park
Hat Creek Ranch
Marble Canyon Provincial Park
Bedard Aspen Provincial Park
Ashcroft Manor Ranch

References

BC Parks infopage

Provincial parks of British Columbia
Thompson Country
1996 establishments in British Columbia
Protected areas established in 1996